Homalium smythei is a species of plant in the family Salicaceae. It is found in Ivory Coast, Guinea, Liberia, and Sierra Leone. It is threatened by habitat loss.

References

smythei
Vulnerable plants
Taxonomy articles created by Polbot